Screen name may refer to:

 Stage name, pseudonyms used for film appearances
 User (computing), pseudonyms used for Internet communications and BBSs